The 5th Politburo of the Lao People's Revolutionary Party (LPRP), officially the Political Bureau of the 5th Central Committee of the Lao People's Revolutionary Party, was elected in 1991 by the 1st Plenary Session of the 5th Central Committee, in the immediate aftermath of the 5th National Congress.

Members

References

Specific

Bibliography 
Books:
 

5th Politburo of the Lao People's Revolutionary Party
1991 establishments in Laos
1996 disestablishments in Laos